RoEduNet is a Romanian educational and research network NREN, member of the European research and education network GÉANT. The network is under the administration of the Administration Agency of the National Network for Education and Informatics Research, AARNIEC (Romanian: Agenția de Administrare a Rețelei Naționale de Informatică pentru Educație și Cercetare).

History
The RoEduNet network appeared as a consequence of an evolutionary process that started after the Romanian Revolution of 1989

1990
Universitatea Politehnica of Bucharest and Technische Universitat Darmstadt started a project whose aim was to develop an experimental e-mail system, and to develop a communications infrastructure connected to the international data network. The German partner donated the equipment and in October 1990 the e-mail system became operational, and the international connectivity was actually a dialup connection.

1991-1992
A new project was developed in collaboration with Deutsches Forschungsnetz. Its purpose was to install a communications server in Bucharest, connected to the German Scientific Network WIN using x25. At the end of 1992, a dedicated x25 line was operational between Bucharest and Germany, and also other Romanian Universities was using the system for e-mail messages.

1993
Universitatea Politehnica implements its first LAN in November, and it was connected to EuropaNet through a 9.6 kbit/s dedicated line, whose other end was in Düsseldorf - Germany.

1996
128 kbit/s line

References

External links

Educational organizations based in Romania
Internet in Romania
National research and education networks